Guy Bernard Williams (born July 1, 1960) is a retired American professional basketball player.  Williams began his career as a point guard, but changed to the forward position upon entering the National Basketball Association (NBA). He played for the Washington Bullets and Golden State Warriors.

Williams played collegiately at San Francisco College from 1978-1980, and then transferred to Washington State where he played the 1981-1983 seasons. His son, Noah Williams, currently plays at Washington State as of 2021.

References

External links
Cougs vs. Dons: Guy Williams knows 'em both
Italian League profile

1960 births
Living people
African-American basketball players
American expatriate basketball people in Belgium
American expatriate basketball people in France
American expatriate basketball people in Israel
American expatriate basketball people in Italy
American expatriate basketball people in Spain
American men's basketball players
Basketball players from Los Angeles
Basketball players from Seattle
Chorale Roanne Basket players
Golden State Warriors players
Power forwards (basketball)
San Francisco Dons men's basketball players
Small forwards
Basketball players from Oakland, California
Washington Bullets draft picks
Washington Bullets players
Washington State Cougars men's basketball players
21st-century African-American people
20th-century African-American sportspeople